During the 2004–05 German football season, Borussia Dortmund competed in the Bundesliga.

Season summary
New boss Bert van Marwijk failed to turn Dortmund's fortunes around and they finished 7th, a place lower than last season, despite earning the same number of points. However, this season they were only four points off Champions League qualification, giving hope that next season they could qualify.

Players

First-team squad
Squad at end of season

Left club during season

Competitions

Bundesliga

League table

References

Notes

Borussia Dortmund seasons
Borussia Dortmund